Tsou may refer to:
the Tsou people, an indigenous people of central southern Taiwan
the Tsou language
 Wade-Giles Romanization of Zou (simplified Chinese: 邹; traditional Chinese: 鄒)
 Peter Tsou, principal science staff member at the Jet Propulsion Laboratory
 Shih-Ching Tsou, Taiwan-born, actress, director, producer
 Tsou Hai-ying, birth name of Jennifer Su (born 1968), South African radio and television personality

Language and nationality disambiguation pages